Jalan Juru (Penang state road P176) is a major road in Penang, Malaysia.

List of junctions

Juru